Limestone Community High School is a public high school in Bartonville, Peoria County, Illinois.  , the school had an average enrollment of 867 students and average full-time equivalent of 70 teachers.

Limestone Community High School is the only general high school of Limestone Community High School District 310; the district also operates the high school program of the Peoria County Juvenile Detention Center.

History
Before the 1950s, Bartonville had no high school of its own; students went to Pekin or Peoria, and their expenses were paid for by a non-high-school district, but without control over the schools the students were attending.  Consolidating with other school districts was considered, but it was determined that joining Peoria Public Schools District 150 would require annexation into the city of Peoria, and that neither the Elmwood or the Glasford school districts had the capacity to take on the 570 students in the area.  A group of educators and other citizens decided that the only solution was to build a high school.

A public election on February 5, 1949, voted District 310 into existence; and, on March 14, the board of education first met and elected its officers.

Limestone Community High School opened on October 14, 1953.  It was annexed into the village of Bartonville in June 1957.

Notable alumni

 Mike Dunne — Major League Baseball player; played in 1984 Los Angeles Olympics
 Jim Thome — former Major League Baseball player who played 22 seasons from 1991 to 2012 and is in the Baseball Hall of Fame

References

External links
 

School districts established in 1953
Public high schools in Illinois
Schools in Peoria County, Illinois
1953 establishments in Illinois
Education in Peoria County, Illinois